Maria Bricca (1684-1733), was an Italian war heroine.  She was a cook living near the Pianezza Fortress in the Duchy of Savoy.  She assisted Prince Eugene of Savoy to conquer the fortress during the Siege of Turin (1705) in the War of the Spanish Succession and was hailed as a war heroine and subject of several legends.  She is the subject of the film Pianezza 1706 - Maria Bricca (2010).

References 

 M. Bonavero, Maria Bricca e la sua storia vera, in "Corriere Avis Torino" [1], 4 (2017), p. 40.

1684 births
1733 deaths
18th-century Italian people
Women in 18th-century warfare
People of the War of the Spanish Succession